Alfred or Al Kahn may refer to:

Alfred E. Kahn (1917–2010), American professor, government official and deregulation expert
Alfred J. Kahn (1919–2009), American child welfare specialist
Alfred R. Kahn (born 1947), American executive, former CEO and chairman of 4Kids Entertainment

See also
Al Khan, suburb of Sharjah, United Arab Emirates